Episome is a collaborative album by Bill Laswell, Otomo Yoshihide and Tatsuya Yoshida. It was released on April 18, 2006 by Tzadik Records.

Track listing

Personnel 
Adapted from the Episome liner notes.
Musicians
Bill Laswell – bass guitar, producer
Otomo Yoshihide – guitar, vocals
Tatsuya Yoshida – drums
Technical personnel
Heung-Heung Chin – design
Scott Hull – mastering
Robert Musso – recording

Release history

References

External links 
 Episome at Discogs (list of releases)

2006 albums
Collaborative albums
Bill Laswell albums
Otomo Yoshihide albums
Albums produced by Bill Laswell
Tzadik Records albums